Bossier Parish is a parish located in the northwestern part of the U.S. state of Louisiana. At the 2020 census, the population was 128,746.

The parish seat is Benton. The principal city is Bossier City, which is located east of the Red River and across from the larger city of Shreveport, the seat of Caddo Parish. The parish was formed in 1843 from the western portion of Claiborne Parish. Bossier Parish is part of the Shreveport–Bossier City metropolitan statistical area, the largest metropolitan area in North Louisiana.

Lake Bistineau and Lake Bistineau State Park are included in parts of Bossier and neighboring Webster and Bienville parishes. Loggy Bayou flows south from Lake Bistineau in southern Bossier Parish, traverses western Bienville Parish, and in Red River Parish joins the Red River.

History

Bossier Parish is named for Pierre Bossier, an ethnic French, 19th-century Louisiana state senator and U.S. representative from Natchitoches Parish.

Bossier Parish was spared fighting on its soil during the American Civil War. In July 1861, at the start of the war, the Bossier Parish Police Jury appropriated $35,000 for the benefit of Confederate volunteers and their family members left behind, an amount then considered generous.

After the war, whites used violence and intimidation to maintain dominance over the newly emancipated freedmen. From the end of Reconstruction into the 20th century, violence increased as conservative white Democrats struggled to maintain power over the state. In this period, Bossier Parish had 26 lynchings of African Americans by whites, part of racial terrorism. This was the fifth-highest total of any parish in Louisiana, tied with the total in Iberia Parish in the South of the state. Overall, parishes in northwest Louisiana had the highest rates of lynchings.

Geography
Four miles east of Bossier City is Barksdale Air Force Base.

Major highways
  Interstate 20
  Interstate 220
  Future Interstate 69
  U.S. Highway 71
  U.S. Highway 79
  U.S. Highway 80
  Louisiana Highway 2
  Louisiana Highway 3

Adjacent counties and parishes
 Miller County, Arkansas  (northwest)
 Lafayette County, Arkansas  (north)
 Webster Parish  (east)
 Bienville Parish  (southeast)
 Red River Parish  (south)
 Caddo Parish  (west)

National protected area
 Red River National Wildlife Refuge (part)

Communities

Cities 
 Bossier City (largest municipality)
 Shreveport (partial)

Towns
 Benton (parish seat)
 Haughton
 Plain Dealing (smallest municipality)

Unincorporated areas

Census-designated places 
 Eastwood
 Red Chute

Unincorporated communities 
 Elm Grove
 Fillmore
 Midway
 Princeton, birthplace of George Dement
 Taylortown

Demographics

At the 2020 United States census, there were 128,746 people, 49,735 households, and 33,963 families residing in the parish. According to the 2010 U.S. census, there were 116,979 people, 62,000 households, and 37,500 families residing in the parish. There were 49,000 housing units at an average density of 48 per squaremile (19/km2).

The racial makeup of the parish in 2010 was 70.66% White, 18.52% Black or African American, 0.82% Native American, 2.18% Asian, 0.18% Pacific Islander, 1.00% from other races, and 1.65% from two or more races; 8.15% of the population were Hispanic or Latino American of any race. According to the 2019 American Community Survey, the racial and ethnic makeup of the parish was 65.9% non-Hispanic white, 23.2% African American, 0.7% Native American, 2.2% Asian, 0.9% some other race, 1.7% two or more races, and 6.9% Hispanic or Latino American of any race. In 2020, its racial and ethnic makeup was 61.35% non-Hispanic white, 23.2% African American, 0.45% Native American, 1.82% Asian, 0.09% Pacific Islander, 5.15% multiracial, and 7.95% Hispanic or Latino American of any race, reflecting nationwide demographic trends of mass diversification.

Law, government and politics
Bossier Parish is governed by a 12-member elected body, the Bossier Parish Police Jury (equivalent to county commission in other states). Members are elected from single-member districts. Eddy Shell, a prominent Bossier City educator, was repeatedly re-elected, serving on the police jury from 1992 until his death in 2008.

The current members of the police jury are:
 District 1 - Bob Brotherton
 District 2 - Glenn Benton
 District 3 - Philip Rogers
 District 4 - John Ed Jordan
 District 5 - Julianna Parks
 District 6 - Chris Marsiglia
 District 7 - Jimmy Cochran
 District 8 - Douglas E. Rimmer
 District 9 - Charles Gray
 District 10 - Jerome Darby
 District 11 - Tom Salzer
 District 12 - Paul M. "Mac" Plummer

Since the late 20th century, the non-Hispanic white population of the parish has shifted from the Democratic to the Republican Party, as have most conservative whites in Louisiana and other Southern U.S. states. Before this, the state was a one-party state dominated by the Democratic Party, in the period after the turn of the century when most blacks were disenfranchised in Louisiana.

Bossier Parish has since reliably supported Republican candidates in most contested U.S. presidential elections. Since 1952, George Wallace, the former governor of Alabama who ran in 1968 on the American Independent Party ticket, is the only non-Republican to have carried Bossier Parish.

In 2008, U.S. Senator John McCain of Arizona won in Bossier Parish with 32,713 votes (71.4 percent) over the Democrat Barack H. Obama of Illinois, who polled 12,703 votes (27.8 percent). In 2012, Mitt Romney polled 34,988 votes (72 percent) in Bossier Parish, or 2,275 more ballots than McCain drew in 2008. President Obama trailed in Bossier Parish with 12,956 votes (26.7 percent), or 253 more votes than he had received in 2008.

In 2011, Bossier Parish elected a Republican, Julian C. Whittington, as sheriff to succeed the long-term Larry Deen. He was a Democrat and later changed his registration to the Republican Party.

National Guard
The 165th CSS (Combat Service Support) Battalion is headquartered in Bossier City.  This unit was deployed to Iraq in 2008.  Also located in Bossier City is the 156TH Army Band which deployed as part of the 256th Infantry Brigade in 2010 to Iraq.

Education
Bossier Parish School Board operates public schools in the parish.

It is in the service area of Bossier Parish Community College.

Notable people
 William Benton Boggs (1854-1922), first mayor of Plain Dealing (1890) and member of the Louisiana House of Representatives from 1892 to 1900 for Bossier Parish and the Louisiana State Senate for Bossier and Webster parishes from 1908 to 1916
 Dewey E. Burchett Jr., state district court judge for Bossier and Webster parishes, 1988-2008
 Roy A. Burrell, state representative from District 2 (Caddo and Bossier parishes) since 2004
 Harvey Locke Carey, lawyer and politician; lived off Wafer Road in Bossier Parish in the 1960s
 Robert Houston Curry (1842-1892), state representative for Bossier Parish from 1888 to 1892; wounded Confederate Army soldier
 Jesse C. Deen, late principal in the Rocky Mount community, served on the Bossier Parish Police Jury and then in the Louisiana House of Representatives from 1972 to 1988. His older son, Larry Callaway Deen, is a former Bossier Parish sheriff.
 E. S. Dortch, planter and politician and last surviving (1943) Bossier Parish veteran of the Confederate States Army
 Jack Favor, a rodeo star, was falsely imprisoned in 1967 at the Louisiana State Penitentiary for the murders of Mr. and Mrs. W. H. Richey.
 Ryan Gatti, state senator for District 36 since 2016; Bossier City lawyer
 Ray Germany, Louisiana Tech Bulldogs basketball All-American in 1959 and 1960; resident of Haughton
Booker T, American professional wrestler and promoter.
 Mike Johnson, Republican member of the Louisiana House of Representatives; constitutional attorney in Benton
 J. A. W. Lowry (died 1899), district attorney and state senator
 Jerry Miculek, American professional speed and competition shooter known for his 20 world records; resides in Princeton
 George Nattin, mayor of Bossier City, 1961-1973
 William Washington Vance, state senator from 1886 to 1892

See also
 National Register of Historic Places listings in Bossier Parish, Louisiana
 Bossier Press-Tribune

References

External links
 Bossier Parish
 Water Resources of Bossier Parish United States Geological Survey

 
1843 establishments in Louisiana
Louisiana parishes
Parishes in Shreveport – Bossier City metropolitan area
Geography of Shreveport, Louisiana
Populated places established in 1843